Red Square is an English free improvising, experimental rock band originally from Southend-on-Sea, Essex, England, that formed in 1974 and broke up in 1978, before reforming again in 2008 as a result of renewed interest in their music. The line up has remained unchanged, consisting of Ian Staples (electric guitar), Jon Seagroatt (soprano saxophone, bass clarinet, flute and electronics) and Roger Telford (drums and percussion).

History

Formation and early history: 1972–1978
The groundwork for what became the Red Square sound was laid when Jon Seagroatt & Ian Staples began a musical collaboration in Southend-on-Sea, Essex in 1972, following encounters at a number of experimental music workshops.

Staples, fresh from the London underground scene, had been gigging regularly at the legendary Middle Earth Club in London with Ginger Johnson's African Drummers, alongside, amongst others, Pink Floyd and Mark Bolan. He was working with tape multi-tracking, noise, psychedelia and action painting. Staples' electric guitar playing was a revolutionary blend of Jimi Hendrix and Captain Beefheart, with the sonic palettes of Derek Bailey and Karlheinz Stockhausen.

Seagroatt, galvanised by the explorations of John Coltrane, John Tchicai, Evan Parker, Steve Lacy, Ornette Coleman and Albert Ayler, also drew freely on groups such as Can, Faust, Weather Report, the Art Ensemble of Chicago and Soft Machine.

Both were also heavily influenced by developments in contemporary 'straight' music.

From the beginning of their collaboration they determined to improvise all of their music. Initially Seagroatt and Staples experimented extensively with tape multi-tracking, using a combination of standard instruments, toys, percussion, voices, violin and prepared electric guitar. Seeking to expand their collaboration by working with other musicians they found a kindred spirit in drummer Roger Telford, a committed exponent of the free-jazz style of kit playing being pioneered at the time by Milford Graves and Sunny Murray.

The combination of electric guitar, amplified bass clarinet & soprano saxophone and drum kit gave Red Square a unique sound palette to explore, as well an instantly recognisable group sound.
The line up of Seagroatt, Staples and Telford remained constant throughout the band's history, as did the original commitment to total improvisation, but, given the group's wide range of influences, their improvisations drew as much on avant-rock as they did on jazz or contemporary improvised music.

Staples became adept at unleashing cunningly atonal guitar riffs, which referenced metal without ever becoming metal. These onslaughts were critiqued and counterposed by Telford's coruscating, densely textured polyrhythms. Seagroatt moved between the two, weaving sinuous cats-cradles of fractured melody in the liminal space where metal met jazz.

Live, the group was often punishingly loud (one urban myth recounts that a Red Square set drowned out Cliff Richard who was playing at a venue half a mile away). Despite the support of mononymous music critic Miles, then writing for NME, they frequently enjoyed a combative relationship with audiences. Their enthusiasm for playing inappropriate venues (including folk clubs and pub-rock dives), and their willingness to engage forcefully with hecklers led to a number of hurried back-door exits from gigs, and presaged the arrival of punk a few years later.

As well as their now legendary semi-squatted 'residency' in a vast, condemned Victorian hotel in Westcliff-on-Sea, Red Square played innumerable gigs (four in one day on one occasion), benefits and student occupations, and gigged with Henry Cow, Red Brass, David Toop & Paul Burwell and Lol Coxhill. They were also active in Music For Socialism.

They released two cassette-only albums, 'Paramusic' and 'Circuitry', the latter being a live recording of a gig with Henry Cow in Southend-on-Sea.

Red Square were in many respects years ahead of their time, predating the experimental work of Sonic Youth and Last Exit by a decade, and The Thing by twenty five years. Methods and sounds that they pioneered have since become common practice amongst experimental and avant-rock musicians.

The group broke up in 1978 in the face of continued audience hostility to their music. Though largely forgotten for 30 years, Red Square were a key link bridging the worlds of psychedelic rock and avant-jazz. The group also had a fierce, ideological commitment to total improvisation delivered through very big speakers. There was an almost proto-punk Quixotism about their railing aural assaults on the mainstream: very few people thanked them for it, and their music was considered far too extreme for release at the time.

Interregnum: 1979–2008
Jon Seagroatt and Ian Staples continued to work together after the original break-up of the group, gigging and releasing albums under the names of B So glObal, Omlo Vent and Miramar for a number of labels including Chillum, Fo Fum and Emergency Broadcast. Seagroatt formed a writing partnership with singer Bobbie Watson which led to the formation of the trip-hop band Drift, and, later, to the punk-jazz inflected Colins of Paradise, whilst Ian developed an extensive catalogue of solo material as the Visitor.

Reformation: 2008–present
In 2008 the members of Red Square were approached by FMR Records who were interested in releasing an album of their recordings from the 1970s. The three so enjoyed trawling through the reels of tape to choose album tracks that they decided to re-form, and they played their first gig in thirty years at Klub Kakofanney in Oxford in 2009.
Since reforming Red Square have gigged regularly and released two further albums. Dates and broadcasts have included Cafe Oto, the Vortex, Resonance FM, Darkstar at the Dogstar, Southend's Culture As A Dare Fringe Festival, Utrophia's Cwm Festival, Oxford Improvisors, Chatham's Brutally Honest Club and Brighton's on the Edge. In addition to gigging Red Square curated and hosted the day-long Tinderbox Festival, that was held annually from 2012-2015 in the village of Cropredy in Oxfordshire, UK.

Since reforming Red Square have attracted critical acclaim for both their live and recorded work, and in 2010 they were the subject of an in-depth feature by Frances Morgan in the journal 'Loops'.

Jon Seagroatt also plays soprano saxophone, flute and percussion with the reformed psychedelic folk band, Comus.

Discography
Thirty Three: Recordings 1974–1978 (2008) 
Shuttle Bag (2009) 
UnReason: Live at the Vortex (2010)
Bird Haus (2012)
Rare and Lost 70s Recordings (2016)

References

External links
Official website

Free improvisation ensembles
English experimental rock groups
Free jazz musicians
FMR Records artists